The Grayback-class submarine''' was a class of two guided missile-carrying submarines of the United States Navy. They carried the Regulus I and Regulus II nuclear cruise missiles, deployed 1957–64, that were rapidly phased out by Polaris Submarine Launched Ballistic Missiles (SLBMs).

Design
On the Graybacks, two missile hangars allowed for a total of two Regulus II or four Regulus I missiles each. Since Regulus II was cancelled in December 1958 except for test firings, the class deployed with four Regulus I missiles. Torpedo armament was the same as the Tangs, with six bow and two stern tubes. The stern tubes were for "swim-out" weapons only, such as the Mark 37 ASW homing torpedo.

In Graybacks later role as an amphibious transport submarine, the former missile hangars were used to store SEAL Swimmer Delivery Vehicles and other equipment used by the SEALs and Marine Force Recon units.

Ships in class
 , launched 1957, served as a missile submarine 1958–1964, converted to an amphibious transport submarine (hull classification symbol LPSS) (initially transport submarine (APSS)) and served as such 1969–1984. Sunk as a target near Subic Bay, Philippines, 13 April 1986.
 , launched 1958, served 1958–1964. Museum ship at the Intrepid Sea-Air-Space Museum in New York City from 29 September 1988.

References
Citations

Bibliography
 Jackson, Robert, Fighting Ships of The World, London: Amber Books Ltd, 2004 Pg.314 
 Gardiner, Robert and Chumbley, Stephen, Conway's All the World's Fighting Ships 1947–1995'', London: Conway Maritime Press, 1995. .

External links

 NavSource.org Guided Missile Submarines photo gallery index

Submarine classes
 
 Grayback class
 Grayback class